Kushal Tandon (born 28 March 1985) is an Indian model and actor known for his portrayal of Virat Singh Vadhera in Ek Hazaaron Mein Meri Behna Hai and Arjun Sharma in Beyhadh. He also participated in Nach Baliye, Bigg Boss and Khatron Ke Khiladi.

Personal life
Tandon was born on 28 March 1985 and is from Lucknow, Uttar Pradesh. He studied in Hansraj College, Delhi and in New York Film Academy. Tandon and Gauahar Khan were in a relationship during Bigg Boss 7 but broke up in 2014 after almost a year. Tandon was also in a relationship with Ridhima Pandit but they broke up after 9 months.

Career
Tandon was the first runner-up of Grasim Mr. India contest held in January 2005. Upon return from the United States after his acting course, he played Virat Singh Vadhera in Ek Hazaaron Mein Meri Behna Hai. During the show, he shaved off his hair to show his support for a bald young cancer patient.

In 2012, he was ranked second in Eastern Eyes 50 Sexiest Asian Men List 2012. Later, Tandon participated in Nach Baliye 5 with his then partner Elena Boeva. In 2013, he participated in reality television show Bigg Boss 7. In 2015, Tandon was seen in Rahat Fateh Ali Khan's music video Zaroori Tha along with girlfriend Gauahar Khan.

In 2016, Tandon portrayed Arjun Sharma opposite Jennifer Winget and Aneri Vajani in Sony TV's Beyhadh. In 2018, he portrayed Rahul in Alt Balaji's Hum - I'm Because of Us. On 26 June 2020, he starred in tech horror film, Unlock in Zee5. In August 2020, he acted in ALTBalaji's Bebaakee.

Tandon also owns a restaurant called "Arbour 28" in Mumbai. He opened the restaurant in February 2020.

Filmography

Films

Television

Web series

Awards

References

External links

 
 

1985 births
Living people
Male actors from Lucknow
Indian male models
Indian male television actors
Indian male soap opera actors
Participants in Indian reality television series
21st-century Indian male actors
Male actors in Hindi television
Fear Factor: Khatron Ke Khiladi participants
Bigg Boss (Hindi TV series) contestants
Models from Uttar Pradesh